Pawnee is a village in Sangamon County, Illinois, United States. Its population was 2,739 at the 2010 census, and 2,651 at a 2018 estimate. It is part of the Springfield, Illinois Metropolitan Statistical Area.

History
The community is named after the Pawnee Tribe.

Geography
Pawnee is located at  (39.592050, -89.582012).

Demographics

At the 2000 census there were 2,647 people, 1,028 households, and 747 families in the village. The racial makeup of the village was 98.83% White, 0.15% African American, 0.11% Native American, 0.19% Asian, 0.04% from other races, and 0.68% from two or more races. Hispanic or Latino of any race were 0.30%.

Of the 1,028 households 40.0% had children under the age of 18 living with them, 59.0% were married couples living together, 10.6% had a female householder with no husband present, and 27.3% were non-families. 23.4% of households were one person and 12.5% were one person aged 65 or older. The average household size was 2.57 and the average family size was 3.06.

The age distribution was 28.1% under the age of 18, 6.8% from 18 to 24, 31.8% from 25 to 44, 21.7% from 45 to 64, and 11.5% 65 or older. The median age was 35 years. For every 100 females, there were 92.8 males. For every 100 females age 18 and over, there were 85.6 males.

The median household income was $50,787 and the median family income  was $54,736. Males had a median income of $37,171 versus $26,304 for females. The per capita income for the village was $21,599. About 5.9% of families and 6.3% of the population were below the poverty line, including 7.6% of those under age 18 and 8.5% of those age 65 or over.

In popular culture
Pawnee is loosely represented in the video game Watch Dogs, though the geographic position is quite different. Due to contiguous map size constraints in the open-world game, Pawnee is shown to be relatively close to Chicago; however, it is actually located nearer to the center of Illinois, far from Chicago.

References

Villages in Sangamon County, Illinois
Villages in Illinois
Springfield metropolitan area, Illinois
Populated places established in 1854
1854 establishments in Illinois